Thomas Wight (died ca. 1608) was a bookseller, publisher and draper in London. Wight published many important books, including many of the earliest law books in English.

Career
Together with his father, the draper John Wight, he published seven editions of William Bourne's book A Regiment for the Sea, the first purely English navigational text.

By time Wight published Bourne's book, he was primarily a publisher, and became part of a monopoly for printing law books in 1599.  He published many of the first printed  English law books, including Fulbeck (1600), discussing study methods for law students, techniques for arguing a case, and suggestions for further reading. Pulton (1600), also published by Wight the same year, was the first book to attempt to summarise English criminal law. Fulbecke (1602) was one of the first books on international law. Saint German (1604) was first published in Latin in 1523, and attempts to describe English law through a dialogue between a churchman and a student of English common law. It ponders the  nature of law, its religious and moral standards, and jurisdiction of Parliament. Manwood (1598) summarises the laws of the forest, known as Carta de Foresta; this was of key interest to English gentlemen, and  went through numerous reprintings. Kitchin (1598) described manorial law, land law, and agrarian law.

Wight published copies of the "Yearbooks", notes by law students which were the earliest English legal reports dating back to the eleventh century.

Wight was also a prominent figure in the early discussions of copyright law. 
 
Edmund Weaver, another famous London book publisher and bookseller, started as Wight's apprentice, and took over the business when Wight died.

Other books published by Wight
 William Fulbecke, London: Printed by Thomas Wight, 1600.
 Sir Edward Coke, London: In aedibus Thomae Wight, 1602.
 Littletons tenures in English. Lately perused and amended., Sir Thomas Littleton, Imprinted at London : By Thomas Wight, 1600.
 Thomas Phayer, Imprinted at London : By [Adam Islip? for] Thomas Wight, 1604.
 William Fulbecke, Printed by Thomas Wight, London, 1601.
 ... , John Kitchin, Thomas Wight & Bonham Norton London 1598
A Treatise and discourse of the Lawes of the Forest: Wherein is Declared Not Onely Those Lawes, As They Are Now In Force, But Also the Originall and Beginning of Forests: And What a Forest is In His Owne Proper Nature, And Wherein the Same Doth Differ From a Chase, A Park, Or a Warren, With All Such Things As Are Incident or Belonging Thereunto, With Their Severall Proper Tearmes of Art. As More at Large Doth Appeare in the Table in the Beginning of This Booke. Also a Treatise of the Purallee, Declaring What Purallee Is, How the Same First Began, What a Pourallee Man May Doe, How He May Hunt and Use His Owne Purallee, How Far He May Pursue and Follow After His Chase, Together With the Lymits and Boundes, Aswell of the Forrest, As the Pourallee. Collected, and Gathered Together, Aswell Out of the Common Lawes and Statutes of This Land, As Also Out of Sundrie Learned Ancient Authors, And Out of the Assises and Iters of Pickering and Lancaster., John Manwood, London: Printed by Thomas Wight and Bonham Norton, 1598.
The Lives of the Noble Grecians and Romaines. Compared Together by that Grave Learned Philosopher and Historiographer, Plutarke of Charones. Translated Out of the Greek into French by Iames Amiot, Abbot of Bellozane, Bishop of Auxerre, One of the King's Privie Counsell, and Great Amner of France, With the Lives of Hannibal and of Scipio African. Translated. out of Latine into French by Charles de l'Esclvse, and Out of the French into English by Sir Thomas North Knight. Hereunto are Also Added the Lives of Epaminondas, of Philip of Macedon, of Dionysius the Elder, Tyrant of Sicilia, of Augustus Cæsar, of Plutarke, and of Seneca: with the Lives of Nine Other Excellent Chiefetaines of Warre:Collected out of Æmylius Probus, by S G S and Englished by the Aforesaid Translator., Plutarch, London: Richard Field for Thomas Wight, 1603.
 William Fulbecke London: Thomas Wight, 1602
 Geoffrey Chaucer London, : Printed by Adam Islip, at the charges of Thomas Wight, Anno 1598.
A Book of the Arte and Manner How to Plant and Graffe All Sorts of Trees. . . ., Leonard Mascall London: Thomas Wight, 1592.
Tractatus de legibus et consuetudinibus regni Angliae, tempore Regis Henrici secundi compositus, Ranulphus de Glanvilla, [bound with] Christopher St. Germain's Dialogus de fundamentis Legun Angliae et de conscientia. [N. p.]: Thomas Wight, 1604
, Edmund Plowden, London : Thomas Wight, 1599.
, Christopher St. Germain, At London : Printed by [Adam Islip for] Thomas Wight, and Bonham Norton, 1598
, John Fortescue ... And translated into English by Robert Mulcaster [De laudibus legum Angliae. English and Latin] London : Printed by Thomas Wight, and Bonham Norton, 1599
, Conrad Heresbach, [Rei rusticae libri quatuor. English] London : Printed by T. Este, for Thomas Wight, 1596
 [Symbolaeographia. Part 2], William West, fl. At London : Printed by Thomas Wight, Anno Do. 1601
, Fardinando Pulton, Printed by Thomas Wight [etc.] London 1600

Yearbooks
Les Reports de Les Cases Conteinus in les Ans Vint Primer, et Apres in Temps del Roy Henry Le Siz: Communement Appelle, The Second Part of Henry the Sixt, Nouelment Reuiew & Correge in Diuers Lieux. London: In Aedibus Thomae Wight, 1601.
Syntomotaxia: Del Second Part Del Roy Henrie le Sixt, Per Quel Facilment Cy Troueront Soubs Apt Titles, Touts Choses Conteinus en le Dit Liuer. London: Printed by Thomas Wight, 1601.

See also
Worshipful Company of Drapers

References

Publishers (people) from London
Law books
1608 deaths
Year of birth unknown
English booksellers
16th-century births
16th-century English businesspeople
17th-century English businesspeople